Simeon Minchev (born 28 June 1982) is a Bulgarian footballer who plays as a midfielder. 

Minchev last played for Panegialios F.C. in Greece before return to play in Stara Zagora. 
Height - 1.84 m.
Weight - 73 kg.

Honours

Club
 Beroe
Bulgarian Cup:
Winner: 2009-10

External links
  footmercato profile

Bulgarian footballers
1982 births
Living people
PFC Beroe Stara Zagora players
First Professional Football League (Bulgaria) players
Panegialios F.C. players

Association football midfielders
Sportspeople from Stara Zagora